Jeff Kready (born in Parsons, Kansas, United States) is an American stage performer and has been featured in Broadway musicals.

Raised in Topeka, Kansas, Kready made his Broadway debut in the 2006 revival of Les Misérables in the role of Babet/Understudy Jean Valjean, and had the distinction of being the youngest actor to portray the role on Broadway until 2015, when Kyle Jean-Baptiste performed the role at 21. The show opened 9 November 2006 at the Broadhurst Theatre and closed on 6 January 2008. His next appearance on Broadway was in the Roundabout Theater Company 2008 Revival of Sunday in the Park with George, directed by Sam Buntrock and starring Daniel Evans (actor) and Jenna Russell.

Kready was the standby for the leading role of Michael Dorsey in the Broadway musical comedy Tootsie, Tootsie is a musical comedy with music and lyrics by David Yazbek and a book by Robert Horn. The musical is based on the 1982 American comedy film of the same name written by Larry Gelbart, Barry Levinson (uncredited), Elaine May (uncredited) and Murray Schisgal from the story by Gelbart and Don McGuire. The musical made its world premiere try-out at the Cadillac Palace Theatre in Chicago in September 2018. The musical has music and lyrics by David Yazbek with the book by Robert Horn, choreography by Denis Jones, scenic design by David Rockwell, costumes by William Ivey Long, lighting by Donald Holder and direction by Scott Ellis.
Santino Fontana stars as Michael Dorsey, with Lilli Cooper as Julie Nichols, Sarah Stiles as Sandy Lester, John Behlmann as Max Van Horn, Andy Grotelueschen as Jeff Slater, Julie Halston as Rita Mallory, Michael McGrath as Stan Fields and Reg Rogers as Ron Carlisle.
The Broadway production began previews on March 29, 2019, at the Marquis Theatre and opened on April 23, 2019.

Prior to that Kready starred in the lead role of Monty Navarro  in the Tony Award winning A Gentleman's Guide to Love and Murder. He had been a member of the Original Broadway Company since November 2013.  The production received nine Tony Award nominations, winning four - including Best Musical, and stars Jefferson Mays. Before taking over the leading role from Bryce Pinkham he appeared in the roles of Tom Copley, Newsboy, Actor and Guard.

Kready was in the original Broadway company of Billy Elliot The Musical, directed by Stephen Daldry and choreographed by Peter Darling.  The Broadway production opened at the Imperial Theatre on  1 October 2008 in previews and officially on 13 November 2008. The production received fifteen Tony Award nominations, winning ten.  Kready took over the lead role of Tony (Billy's Brother) Summer 2010 Through 29 August 2010. Kready then left the show to originate the role of Tony on the second National Tour beginning November 2010.

Kready was featured as Bert Healey in Annie Live!, a musical television special that aired on NBC on December 2, 2021. It was a performance of the 1977 musical Annie, which is based on the comic strip Little Orphan Annie by Harold Gray.

The special starred newcomer Celina Smith as the titular role, Harry Connick Jr. as Daddy Warbucks, Taraji P. Henson as Miss Hannigan, Nicole Scherzinger as Grace Farrell, Tituss Burgess as Rooster Hannigan, and Megan Hilty as Lily St. Regis. The special was directed by Lear deBessonet and Alex Rudzinski.

Off-Broadway, Kready starred in the World Premiere of Tokio Confidential for the Atlantic Theater Company in the role of Ernest alongside of Jill Paice (Isabella). Other notable performances include the World Premiere of In This House (Two River Theater Company) in Red Bank, New Jersey. The book, In This House, was written by Jonathan Bernstein with Mike Reid and Sarah Schlesinger and was directed by May Adrales. Kready starred in the 2012 production of the Rodgers and Hammerstein classic Carousel in the role of Enoch Snow opposite Jenn Gambatese (Carrie), for which he received a Connecticut Critics Circle Nomination for Outstanding Supporting Actor in a Musical,. David Sedaris' one-man-show The Santaland Diaries at Hartford's Theaterworks, and Thoroughly Modern Millie (musical) in the role of Jimmy, co-produced by the Maltz Jupiter Theater in Jupiter, Florida and Paper Mill Playhouse in Millburn, New Jersey. The production also starred Lenora Nemetz, Burke Moses and Branda Braxton. Jeff also starred in Paper Mill Playhouse production of Holiday Inn (musical) in the role of Ted Hanover, and Pittsburgh Civic Light Opera's production of Brigadoon in the role of Tommy Albright. Kready is a vocalist in the South Park 25th Season orchestra trailers.

In addition to Kready's stage credits, he can be found guest starring in the Emmy-nominated HBO series Boardwalk Empire appearing in season 3, episode 6. Other television credits include a recurring co-star role in the CBS crime drama Elementary, The Good Fight web television series produced for CBS's streaming service CBS All Access, and in the CBS drama The Code.

Kready has also performed voiceover work in the UMPQUA Bank television commercial campaign. He also sang on his wife's debut album, Home.

Kready is a 2000 graduate of Washburn Rural High School. In 2004, he earned a Bachelor of Arts degree in Voice Performance and Vocal Music Education from  Washburn University. and has also studied religious studies at Central Baptist Theological Seminary.

References

External links
 
 
 
  (archive)
 Jeff Kready at Broadway World
 Photos - George in the Park
 CDBaby Album Information
 UMPQUA Bank commercial on YouTube

American male stage actors
Living people
People from Parsons, Kansas
Actors from Topeka, Kansas
Year of birth missing (living people)